Josh Gracin is the debut album by the American country music singer of the same name. It was released in the United States on June 15, 2004 on Lyric Street Records, reached number eleven on the Nielsen Soundscan album chart and sold 57,048 the first week. It garnered a Gold certification and has sales of 703,000 copies as of December 2010, one of only three by new male country singers introduced in four years to earn a gold album.

Content
The tracks "I Want to Live", "Nothin' to Lose", and "Brass Bed" (which was re-titled "Stay with Me (Brass Bed)" upon release to radio) were all released as singles, peaking at number four, number one, and number five, respectively, on the country charts. "Nothin' to Lose" was originally recorded by its co-writer, Marcel, on his 2003 album You, Me and the Windshield.

The album was recorded while he was still serving in the Marine Corps, recording it when on leave, during holidays and weekends.

Critical reception

Aaron Lathan of AllMusic commended producer Marty Williams for crafting an album that while mostly "a basic musical country stew," contains tracks that complement Gracin's vocal performance, saying "There is nothing daring or adventurous in the music or with Gracin himself, but that's just fine [...] it's remarkable that he was able to focus and record a consistent and pleasant debut." Brian Mansfield of USA Today highlighted "I Want to Live" and praised Gracin's delivery but felt he chose by-the-numbers country tracks for the album, concluding that, "[T]he rest of the songs could have been recorded by any already-forgotten singer at any time during the past five years."

Track listing

Personnel
As listed in liner notes.
Tim Akers - piano, keyboards, Hammond B-3 organ, accordion
Larry Beaird - acoustic guitar
Mike Brignardello - bass guitar on "Nothin' to Lose", "No One to Share the Blame" and "I Would Look Good with You"
Eric Darken - percussion
Dan Dugmore - steel guitar on "Nothin' to Lose", "No One to Share the Blame" and "The Other Little Soldier". lap steel guitar on "Turn It Up," Dobro on "I Would Look Good with You"
Paul Franklin - steel guitar, lap steel guitar on "Endless Helpless Hoping"
Josh Gracin - lead vocals
Kirk "Jelly Roll" Johnson - harmonica on "Peace of Mind"
Jerry McPherson - electric guitar
Russell Terrell - background vocals
Lonnie Wilson - drums
Glenn Worf - bass guitar
Jonathan Yudkin - fiddle, mandolin, cello, octofone, viola

Chart performance

Weekly charts

Year-end charts

Singles

Sales

Certifications

References

2004 debut albums
Josh Gracin albums
Lyric Street Records albums